The Daily Sabah (lit. "Daily Morning") is a Turkish pro-government daily, published in Turkey. Available in English, Arabic, and owned by Turkuvaz Media Group, Daily Sabah published its first issue on 24 February 2014. The editor-in-chief is Ibrahim Altay.

The newspaper has been frequently called a propaganda outlet for the Turkish government and the ruling Justice and Development Party (AKP). It is owned by a friend of Recep Tayyip Erdoğan.

History
The Daily Sabah was established in 2014 when a highly-antagonistic political climate reigned in Turkish politics. After the conflict in December 2013 between the Gulen movement, a religious civil society organization with some political aspirations, and the ruling Justice and Development Party (AKP), the Gulen movement's Today's Zaman turned into an ardent critic of the ruling AKP. To balance the critical discourse against the AKP by Today's Zaman and Hürriyet Daily News, a secular critic of the AKP, Daily Sabah emerged as a supportive voice of the AKP in the English language.

Editorial policy and viewpoints
The newspaper describes itself as "committed to the democracy, the rule of law, human rights and liberty". Despite this official description, Daily Sabah is a mouthpiece of the AKP.

According to the German newspaper Spiegel Online, Daily Sabah is very critical of the Gulen movement, which the AKP government accuses of trying to overthrow the government in an attempted coup d'état in 2016. Daily Sabah has been described as using transparent and ill-formed, Turkish-style propaganda to advance the AKP government's version of events.

Criticism

Freedom of expression 
In March 2017, a Dutch member of the European Parliament called Daily Sabah "hate press" and tried to prohibit the distribution of Daily Sabah in parliamentary sessions. The European Parliament has made accusations about the lack of freedom of speech and expression in Turkey, and Daily Sabah defends the AKP government's human rights record. Daily Sabah has said the decision to prohibit its distribution was a violation of the freedoms of the press and expressions. Meanwhile, the EU Affairs Minister for Turkey Ömer Çelik said the following about the issue: "The European Parliament's ban on the freedom of press is a tragic event for the future of Europe."

Notable columnists
 Burhanettin Duran
 Ibrahim Kalin

References

External links 
 

2014 establishments in Turkey
Daily newspapers published in Turkey
English-language newspapers published in Turkey
Newspapers published in Istanbul
Propaganda organizations
Publications established in 2014